Gottlieb Duttweiler (15 August 1888 – 8 June 1962) was a Swiss businessman and politician, founder of both the Migros chain of grocery stores and the Alliance of Independents (Landesring der Unabhängigen) party.

Life and work 
Duttweiler was born in Zürich. Starting with five vehicles in 1925, his Migros eventually opened stores and is today one of the main grocery chains in Switzerland. The original secret to his success was bringing daily necessities to the consumer by excluding the middlemen. As a result, many producers initially chose to boycott Migros, and Duttweiler's Migros would itself manufacture or package those missing products. In 1941, Gottlieb and his wife Adele Duttweiler transferred ownership of Migros to their customers, as a cooperative. Duttweiler also required that Migros contribute a percentage of profits (actual from the total revenue) to cultural, athletic, and hobby-related activities. This led to the Migros-club-schools and several hobby courses.

He also initiated the so-called Park im Grüene or Dutti-Park at the site of the later institute that was named after Gottlieb Duttweiler. In 1949, he participated at the former Buchclub Ex Libris, which was integrated in the Migros group in 1956. The Zürich-based Reederei Zürich AG ordered at the H. C. Stülcken Sohn shipyard in Hamburg, Germany, the cargo ship Adele which was launched in Hamburg on 15 July 1952, the ship was christened by Adele Duttweiler, the wife of Gottlieb Duttweiler, on behalf of the Federation of Migros Cooperatives (Migros Genossenschaftsbund). In 1958, he founded the Migros Bank.

Duttweiler also founded the political party Alliance of Independents (Landesring der Unabhängigen). Adele and Gottlieb Dutweiler established the Adele und Gottlieb Duttweiler Stiftung to ensure the future work of the Migros chain as a cooperative according to the founding act.

Duttweiler died in Zurich. The Gottlieb Duttweiler Institute in Rüschlikon was founded after his death.

References

Gallery

External links 

 

1888 births
1962 deaths
Businesspeople from Zürich
Alliance of Independents politicians
Members of the National Council (Switzerland)
Members of the Council of States (Switzerland)
20th-century Swiss businesspeople
Cooperative organizers
Rüschlikon
Migros people
Swiss philanthropists
Swiss company founders
20th-century philanthropists